was a Japanese nuclear physicist who worked in France. She was the first Japanese female physicist.

Early life and education
Yuasa was born in Taitō Ward, Tokyo, in 1909. Her father was an engineer who worked for the Japanese patent office. Her mother was from a traditional literary family – her mother's grandfather was Tachibana Moribe. Toshiko was the second-youngest of seven children. She attended the Division of Science at Tokyo Women's Higher Normal School (now Ochanomizu University) from 1927 until her graduation in 1931. She then enrolled in the Department of Physics at Tokyo Bunrika University (now the University of Tsukuba), making her the first woman in Japan to study physics. She graduated in 1934.

Career
Yuasa began teaching at Tokyo Bunrika University as a part-time vice-assistant after graduating in 1934. There, she began her research into molecular spectroscopy. In 1935 she became a lecturer at Tokyo Women's Christian College, where she remained until 1937. The following year, she was hired as an assistant professor at Tokyo Women's Higher Normal School.

Yuasa was inspired by the discovery of artificial radioactivity by Irène and Frédéric Joliot-Curie at the Radium Institute in Paris. Because of difficult research conditions in Tokyo, Yuasa moved to Paris in 1940, even though the Second World War had just begun in Europe. She worked under Frédéric Joliot-Curie at the Collège de France, where she researched the alpha and beta particles emitted by artificial radioactive nuclei and the energy spectrum of beta particles. With her thesis, titled "Contribution à l'étude du spectre continu des rayons β− émis par les corps radioactifs artificiels" (Continuous beta-ray spectrum generated by artificial radioactivity), she earned a doctorate in science in 1943.

With the Allied armies approaching Paris in August 1944, as a citizen of a country allied to Germany, Yuasa was urged to leave Paris. She continued her research in a laboratory in the University of Berlin and developed her own beta-ray spectrometer. In 1945, she was ordered by Soviet officials to return to Japan; she travelled with her spectrometer carried on her back. Upon her return to Tokyo, she returned again to Tokyo Women's Higher Normal School as a professor. She was unable to continue her previous research, however, since the United States Occupation Forces prohibited nuclear research in Japan. From 1946 to 1949, she worked at the RIKEN Nishina Center for Accelerator-Based Science and lectured at Kyoto University in 1948–1949.

Yuasa returned to France in May 1949 as a researcher for the Centre national de la recherche scientifique (CNRS) while remaining a professor-on-leave at Ochanomizu University. She decided to stay in France permanently in 1955, resigning from her post at Ochanomizu. At the CNRS, she began research into beta decay using a Wilson chamber, and published a 1954 article warning of the dangers of hydrogen-bomb testing at Bikini Atoll. She was promoted to maître de recherche (chief researcher) at CNRS in 1957. Her research shifted into nuclear reactions using synchrocyclotrons around 1960, and in 1962 she received a doctorate in science from Kyoto University for her thesis, "Étude du type d’invariant de l’interaction Gamow-Teller en désintégration β− de 6He" (Form of Gamow-Teller invariant interaction on beta decay of 6He).

Retirement, death and legacy
Yuasa retired from the CNRS in 1974, but remained an emeritus researcher from 1975 onward. She received a Medal with Purple Ribbon from the Japanese government in 1976 for her efforts to promote cultural exchanges between France and Japan. She died from cancer on 1 February 1980, aged 70.

Yuasa was posthumously conferred the Order of the Precious Crown of the Third Class in 1980. Ochanomizu University introduced the Toshiko Yuasa Prize in 2002, a sponsorship for young women scientists to travel to France for further study.

References

1909 births
1980 deaths
20th-century  Japanese physicists
Ochanomizu University alumni
Academic staff of Ochanomizu University
Japanese nuclear physicists
Japanese women physicists
20th-century Japanese women scientists
Japanese expatriates in France
People from Taitō
French National Centre for Scientific Research scientists
Women nuclear physicists